Blessy Ipe Thomas is an Indian film director and screenwriter who works in Malayalam cinema. He has won one National Film Award and six Kerala State Film Awards for his feature films Kaazhcha (2004), Thanmathra (2005), and Pranayam (2011). His documentary film 100 Years of Chrysostom (2018) received the Guinness World Record for the longest documentary in the world, with a runtime of 48 hours and 10 minutes.

Early life and family
Blessy was born on 3 September 1963 in Tiruvalla, a small town in Pathanamthitta district. He was the youngest of six children born to Benny Thomas and Ammini Thomas. He lost his parents at a very young age. He studied at Mar Thoma School, SCS High School and Mar Thoma College in Tiruvalla.

Blessy is married to Mini and has two children.

Career 
Blessy learned his trade as an assistant director with filmmakers such as Padmarajan, Lohithadas and Jayaraj. He scripted and directed his debut movie Kaazhcha  in 2004. Kaazcha portrayed the story of an orphaned boy, a victim of Gujarat earthquake and how he changes the life of a small-town film operator (played by Mammootty) and his family. The film won three Kerala State Film Awards including Best Debut Director, Best Film with Popular Appeal and Aesthetic Value, and Best Actor (Mammootty).

His second film was Thanmathra (2005), which depicted the story of a middle-class government employee (played by Mohanlal) and his family, and portrayed the effects of Alzheimer's disease on his life and his family. The film won Blessy National Award for the Best Feature Film in Malayalam and five Kerala State Film Awards including Best Film, Best Director, Best Screenplay and Best Actor (Mohanlal).

Blessy's next venture had Mammootty in Palunku (2006), followed by Calcutta News (2008), starring Dileep and Meera Jasmine, went on to be marginal hits. Bhramaram (2009), which had Mohanlal once again in the lead role was another successful film. It was a story of revenge against those that falsely accused a man of murder and ruined his life. His 2011 film Pranayam includes Mohanlal, Anupam Kher, and Jaya Prada. His 2013 film Kalimannu starring Swetha Menon and Biju Menon in leading roles dwelled upon the theme of childbirth and the maternal and paternal connect towards a child. Menon's labor was shot live in the film.

He directed a biopic documentary film titled 100 Years of Chrysostom (2018) based on the life of Christian prelate Philipose Mar Chrysostom Mar Thoma. Beginning in 2015, it took two years to complete filming. A public screening was held for five consecutive days. With a runtime of 48 hours and 10 minutes, the film received the Guinness World Record for the longest documentary in the world. The film is narrated by Mohanlal. His upcoming film Aadujeevitham is a survival drama based on the novel of the same name by Benyamin. It stars Prithviraj Sukumaran in the lead role and has music composed by A. R. Rahman. The film's production lasted over five years, mainly due to the COVID-19 pandemic.

Filmography

Awards 
National Film Awards
2005: National Film Award for Best Feature Film in Malayalam – Thanmathra

Kerala State Film Awards

2011 : Best Director – Pranayam
2005 : Best Director – Thanmathra
2005 : Best Screen Play – Thanmathra
2005 : Best Film: Thanmathra
2004 : Best Film with Popular Appeal and Aesthetic Value – Kaazhcha
2004 : Best Debut Director – Kaazhcha

Filmfare Awards South
2011: Best Director – Pranayam
2005: Best Director – Thanmathra
2004: Best Director – Kaazhcha

Asianet Film Awards
2005:Best Director Award -Thanmathra
2004:Best Film Award – Kaazhcha

Other awards
2006: Kalavedi International Prathibha Award Best Film Maker – Thanmathra
2005: Kalavedi International Prathibha Award Best Film Maker – Kaazhcha
2005: 15th Ramu Kariat Award - Kaazhcha

References

External links 
 
 Blessy at the Facebook

Malayalam film directors
Kerala State Film Award winners
Malayalam screenwriters
Living people
People from Pathanamthitta
Filmfare Awards South winners
Indian male screenwriters
Screenwriters from Kerala
21st-century Indian film directors
Male actors in Malayalam cinema
Indian male film actors
21st-century Indian dramatists and playwrights
Male actors from Kerala
21st-century Indian male writers
Year of birth missing (living people)
21st-century Indian screenwriters
1963 births